Henri Lachambre (30 December 1846, Vagney, Vosges  – 12 June 1904) was a French manufacturer of balloons. His factory was in the Paris suburb Vaugirard. He also participated in ballooning himself carried out 500 ascents. 

Lachambre supplied balloons to both the US Signal Corps  and the ill-fated arctic mission of S. A. Andrée in 1897. He also worked with the Brazilian aviation pioneer Alberto Santos-Dumont, taking him for his first balloon ascent and going on to construct his first balloon in 1898 and later the envelopes for his dirigibles.

Together with his nephew Alexis Machuron Lachambre wrote a book about Andrée's expedition, Au pôle nord en ballon (Imprimerie Nilsson, 1897, 250 pages), which was quickly translated into Swedish, English, French, German, Italian, Dutch and Polish.

Notes 

  Parkinson, R. J. (1960) "United States Signal Corps Balloons, 1871-1902" in Military Affairs

1846 births
1904 deaths
People from Vosges (department)
Aviation pioneers
Members of the Early Birds of Aviation
French aerospace engineers
French aviators
French balloonists